North Tahoe High School is a public high school located in the eastern Placer County settlement of Tahoe City, California, on the northern side of Lake Tahoe. It is one of two high schools in Tahoe-Truckee Unified School District; its counterpart is Truckee High School in nearby Truckee.

North Tahoe High competes in the Nevada Interscholastic Activities Association, along with four other similarly isolated California schools including South Tahoe High and Truckee High.

References

High schools in Placer County, California
Public high schools in California